Peter Slade (born 27 March 1954) is a former Australian rules footballer who played with Melbourne in the Victorian Football League (VFL).

Notes

External links 		

		
		
		
		
1954 births
Australian rules footballers from Victoria (Australia)		
Melbourne Football Club players
Living people